Daily News Botswana is an English language newspaper published in Gaborone, Botswana.

History

Gallery

See also 

Azhizhi
 Mmegi
 Botswana Guardian
 The Botswana Gazette
 Yarona FM

References

External links 

 Official website 

English-language newspapers published in Africa
African news websites